The women's 1500 metres at the 2010 European Athletics Championships will be held at the Estadi Olímpic Lluís Companys on 30 July and 1 August.

Medalists

Records

Schedule

Results

Round 1

Heat 1

Heat 2

Summary

Final

References
 Qualification Results
 Final Results
Full results

1500
1500 metres at the European Athletics Championships
2010 in women's athletics